Salsa Celtica are a Scottish group that plays a fusion of salsa music with traditional Scottish instruments, including elements of folk and jazz.

History
Salsa Celtica was formed in 1995 by Scottish jazz and folk musicians. In 1997 they visited Cuba to study and absorb the musical culture and influences of the country. Inspired by the trip they released their debut album Monstruos y Demonios, (Monsters and Demons) that same year. It went on to receive critical and popular acclaim.

Since the release of their first album, Salsa Celtica have toured most of Scotland, including the Hebrides from Iona to Orkney, as well as the rest of the United Kingdom and Ireland. They have played at numerous festivals, including T in the Park, Celtic Connections, the Hebridean Celtic Festival, The Highland Festival, Glastonbury Festival, Cambridge Folk Festival, Milwaukee Irish Fest (Milwaukee, WI, USA), Trowbridge Folk Festival, Celtic Fusion Festival and the Aberdeen, Cork, Dundee, Edinburgh, and Glasgow Jazz Festivals. They have toured Europe and North America as well as parts of South-East Asia.

In 1998, Salsa Celtica performed at Edinburgh's Hogmanay celebrations in front of 40,000 people: this was broadcast live on UK television. In 1999 the band returned to Cuba after being invited to appear in Havana and Santiago to work with Conjunto Folklorico de Cutumba.

In 2003, the band's third album El Agua De La Vida reached number 5 on the World Music Chart of Europe and number 24 in the end of year round-up 2003 World Music Chart for Europe. In 2004 the band toured the UK for the first time, including a headline performance at Queen Elizabeth Hall on London's South Bank.

Salsa Celtica have appeared on BBC Radio 2's folk programme The Mike Harding Show and BBC Radio 3's Andy Kershaw Show. The release of El Agua De La Vida in 2004 was also met with critical acclaim, including in the Evening Standard.

Salsa Celtica played in and on the soundtrack of the film Driving Lessons (2006), written and directed by Jeremy Brock, a coming-of-age story starring Rupert Grint, Laura Linney and Julie Walters.

In November 2006 the band were nominated for 2007 BBC Radio 2 Folk Awards in the "Best Traditional Song" category for their rendition of the traditional English song "The Grey Cockerel" sung as "The Grey Gallito" by guest vocalist Eliza Carthy.

Members of Salsa Celtica and Rumba Caliente formed an 11-piece Latin soul orchestra, Grupo Magnético, including Toby Shippey, Angelica Lopez and Ricardo Fernandez Pompa. In 2018, they released an album, Positivo. In June 2019, they played at the Glastonbury Festival.

Current members
 Ricardo Fernandez Pompa - lead vocals, percussion
 Simon Gall - piano
 Megan Henderson- fiddle, lead vocals
 Toby Shippey - bongos, cowbell
 Dougie "El Pulpo" Hudson - congas
 Sue McKenzie - saxophone
 Shanti Jayasinha - trumpet
 Phil O'Malley - trombone
 John Speirs- bass guitar
 Steve Kettley - saxophone
 Éamonn Coyne - banjo, tenor guitar
 Ross Ainslie - bagpipes, whistle, cittern
 Eric Alfonso - timbales
 Joe Peat - sound

Discography
 Monstruos y Demonios, Angels and Lovers (1997) Eclectic Records
 The Great Scottish Latin Adventure (2000) Greentrax Recordings
 El Agua de la Vida (2003) Greentrax Recordings
 El Camino (2006) Discos León
 En Vivo en el Norte - In Concert (2010) Discos León
 The Tall Islands (2014) Discos León

Former members
 Martyn Bennett
 Galo Ceron-Carrasco
 Stevie Christie
 Jenny Gardner
 Steve Kettley
 Paul Harrison
 Andi Neate
 Lino Rocha - Lead vocal/composer

References

External links

Salsa Celtica's official website
Interview with Toby 'El Leon' Shippey from Salsa Celtica

Scottish folk music groups
Salsa music groups
Celtic fusion groups
Musical groups established in 1995